My Reputation is a 1946 American romantic drama film directed by Curtis Bernhardt. Barbara Stanwyck portrays an upper-class widow whose romance with an army officer causes trouble for her gossiping friends, domineering mother and young sons. Catherine Turney wrote the script, an adaptation of Clare Jaynes' 1942 novel Instruct My Sorrows. Stanwyck's costumes were designed by Edith Head.

Plot 
When her beloved husband dies after a long illness, Jessica "Jess" Drummond is comforted by the executor of her husband's estate lawyer, Frank Everett, a longtime family friend who later shows an interest in dating her. Jess has two boys, 14-year-old Keith and 12-year-old Kim. She tries to reconnect with her friends but finds that they remind her too much of her husband. George Van Orman, an old friend, forces himself on her and she rejects his advances. She runs to her friend Ginna Abbott and accompanies Ginna and her husband Cary on a vacation to Lake Tahoe.

When Jess finds herself lost with a broken ski, she meets Major Scott Landis, who helps her back to the Abbotts' lodge. Jess and Scott become acquainted but she spurns his romantic advances and tells him to leave. Back home in Lake Forest, Jess learns that Scott has been seen at a club. Jess goes to the club to find Scott and discovers that he is stationed in Chicago. However, he refrains from telling her that he is waiting for military orders to be deployed overseas.

When a friend of Jess's mother sees Jess enter Scott's apartment, gossip spreads among Jess's friends, including George's wife Riette and their children. Jess's mother Mary confronts Scott on Christmas Eve. Jess's relationship with Scott is platonic, though Jess has begun to return his affections, initially out of spite against the rumor mill. She later confronts the gossipers at a New Year's Eve party, where Riette expresses her disapproval of Jess's behavior. Jess denies any wrongdoing and resents Riette's intrusion.

After Jess tells Scott that she loves him, he tells her that he must report to New York the next day for his next overseas assignment. Jess wants to accompany him to New York so that may spend their remaining time together. They agree to meet at the train platform. Kim and Keith ask her if she is really going to New York, and she confirms that she is.

In the early morning, Jess discovers that the boys have fled to Mary's house. They think that her planned trip to New York with Scott means that the gossip is true. Jess assures them that she loved their father but that she can also love another.

Jess hurries to the train platform to meet Scott. She informs him that she cannot accompany him as her sons are too young to understand the situation. Scott tells her that he is meant to be with her and asks her to wait for his return. He then departs on the train.

Cast 

 Barbara Stanwyck as Jessica Drummond  
 George Brent as Maj. Scott Landis  
 Warner Anderson as Frank Everett  
 Lucile Watson as Mrs. Mary Kimball  
 John Ridgely as Cary Abbott  
 Eve Arden as Ginna Abbott  
 Jerome Cowan as George Van Orman  
 Esther Dale as Anna  
 Scotty Beckett as Kim Drummond  
 Bobby Cooper as Keith Drummond  
 Leona Maricle as Riette Van Orman  
 Mary Servoss as Mary  
 Cecil Cunningham as Mrs. Stella Thompson  
 Janis Wilson as Penny Boardman  
 Ann E. Todd as Gretchen Van Orman

Release 
Though the film was produced in 1944 on the heels of Stanwyck's great success, Double Indemnity, it was not released in the U.S. until 1946. It was first distributed for showing to members of the armed forces.

Box office 
According to Warner Bros. records, the film earned $2,775,000 in the U.S. and $1,226,000 in other markets.

References

External links 

 
 
 
 

1946 films
1946 romantic drama films
1940s Christmas drama films
American Christmas drama films
American romantic drama films
American black-and-white films
Films about widowhood
Films based on American novels
Films directed by Curtis Bernhardt
Films set in Chicago
War romance films
Warner Bros. films
1940s English-language films
1940s American films